This is a list of catgirls and catboys — characters with cat traits, such as cat ears, a cat tail, or other feline characteristics on an otherwise human body. The list excludes anthropomorphic cats (e.g. Hello Kitty, Top Cat, The Cat in the Hat), humans dressed in cat costumes, and characters that fully transform between cat and human and not some in-between stage. It may include characters that wear a cat-themed costume, but only if there is strong recognition as a catgirl or catboy by news sources, as with Catwoman. For franchise characters, they are listed by their originating media, with ones in manga and anime listed separately from television and film.

In anime and manga
 Himari Noihara, a bakeneko from Omamori Himari
 Ichigo Momomiya, who transforms into a catgirl, from Tokyo Mew Mew
 Yuni/Cure Cosmo from Star Twinkle PreCure
 The Caitan race from Cat Planet Cuties
 Dejiko from Di Gi Charat
 Felix/Ferris Argyle from Re:Zero
Sailor Tin Nyanko from Sailor Moon

In animation
 Blake Belladonna, a character of the Faunus race from RWBY
 Catra from the She-Ra franchise.
 M'Ress, a Caitian communications officer from Star Trek: The Animated Series
 Olive, a catgirl in High Guardian Spice
 Pururin, a catgirl Puru Puru Pururin, a show-within-a-show in the novel Welcome to the N.H.K.
 T'Ana, a Caitian doctor and head of medical aboard the Cerritos from Star Trek: Lower Decks

In literature and comics
 Black Cat (Felicia Hardy) from the Spider-Man franchise
 C'Mell, from the 1962 science-fiction short story "The Ballad of Lost C'Mell", a woman who was created from cat DNA.
 Catreece, a main character in the Reality Check! comic by Rikki Simons and Tavisha Wolfgarth-Simons
 Tigra from Marvel Comics
 Catwoman from DC Comics
 Kitrina Falcone, the main DC universe Catgirl; a protégée of Catwoman
 Carrie Kelley, a DC Comics superheroine who also adopts the Catgirl moniker
 Cheetah, an enemy of the DC Comics hero Wonder Woman
 Nyara, a human who was transformed into a catgirl by his father's magical experiments, from Mercedes Lackey's Valdemar book series
 An ancient Western story of Venus and the Cat, famously reflected Jean de La Fontaine's fable "The cat changed into a woman", has a catgirl protagonist. She is usually a cat turned into a normal-looking woman but retaining feline character. 
 The troll bloodline consisting of Nepeta Leijon, Meulin Leijon, and the Disciple from the webcomic Homestuck

In live-action film
 Aissa from the 1996 film The Island of Dr. Moreau played by Fairuza Balk. 
 A Caitian Cat Lady from the 1989 film Star Trek V: The Final Frontier, portrayed by stuntwoman Linda Fetters. Originally Introduced in Star Trek: The Animated Series. Also seen in Star Trek Into Darkness.
 Kitty from the 2001 film Monkeybone played by Rose McGowan
 Tiger Cub, a werecat from the 2004 film Night Watch
 Cup Jon Dee, a member and practicing economic magician from the Satanic Temple in the 2019 documentary Hail Satan?

In live-action television
 Chloe, Alek, Jasmine, Valentina, from The Nine Lives of Chloe King are part of the Mai, a cat-like race descended from Bast.
 Dr. Katherine "Kat" Manx from Power Rangers S.P.D., played by Michelle Langstone
Katarina from Dark Angel Season 2 episode 5: "Boo", played by Sarah Carter.

In video games
 Kokonoe Mercury, a half-cat scientist from the BlazBlue series
 Taokaka, another BlazBlue character, who is the guardian of her village in the game series
 Felicia, from Darkstalkers
 Misaki, a human who is granted a wish to transform into her cat Yoriko, during which she is a catgirl, from the 2002 visual novel Da Capo 
Diona, a bartender who is of the Kätzlein race from the 2020 RPG Genshin Impact
The Mithra race from Final Fantasy XI
The Miqo'te race from Final Fantasy XIV
 The Nekos race from the Nekopara visual novel game series.
 Kyaru from Princess Connect! Re:Dive
 Xiao from Dark Cloud
 The Gormotti race from Xenoblade Chronicles 2
 Mio from Xenoblade Chronicles 3
 Che'nya from Disney Twisted-Wonderland

See also

 List of fictional felines

References

Lists of fictional females
Catgirls